Reginald A Barnett (born 15 October 1945) is a British retired cyclist. He competed in the sprint event at the 1968 Summer Olympics. He was the national sprint champion on six occasions in 1967, 1968, 1969, 1970, 1972 and 1973.

He also represented England in the 1,000 metres match sprint, at the 1966 British Empire and Commonwealth Games in Kingston, Jamaica.

References

External links
 

1945 births
Living people
British male cyclists
Olympic cyclists of Great Britain
Cyclists at the 1968 Summer Olympics
Cyclists from Greater London
People from Eltham
Cyclists at the 1966 British Empire and Commonwealth Games
Commonwealth Games competitors for England
20th-century British people